Cornell-Van Nostrand House, also known as Schumacher House, is a historic home located at New Hyde Park in Nassau County, New York.  It was moved to its present location on the grounds of Clinton G. Martin Park in 1952. It is a two-story, architecturally mixed wood-frame building containing an early 19th-century section, two mid-19th-century sections, and an early 20th-century addition.  It is arranged in a "T" shaped plan on a concrete foundation with brick above grade. It features a single height portico with square Doric order columns and a simple entablature, built about 1850.

It was listed on the National Register of Historic Places in 2007. The house is currently in a state of advanced disrepair, boarded up and exposed to the elements via numerous holes in the roof.

References

External links
Preservation Notes Newsletter, Society for the Preservation of Long Island Antiquities, Volume XL, XL Nos. 1 and 2 Fall 2004

Houses on the National Register of Historic Places in New York (state)
Greek Revival houses in New York (state)
Houses completed in 1869
Houses in Nassau County, New York
National Register of Historic Places in North Hempstead (town), New York
1869 establishments in New York (state)